Hans von Hentig (9 June 1887, in Berlin – 6 July 1974, in Bad Tölz) was a German criminal psychologist and politician. He was the second son of lawyer Otto von Hentig (1852–1934) .His older brother was later diplomat Werner Otto von Hentig. Otto von Hentig was one of the leading lawyers in Berlin. Hans von Hentig was instrumental in the setting up of a short-lived Bavarian Soviet Republic in 1919. During the 1920s he was a prominent exponent of National Bolshevism. He emigrated to United States in 1935. Hans von Hentig worked for some time at Yale and other universities.

References
 Louis Dupeux, Nationalbolschewismus in Deutschland 1919–1933. C. H. Beck, Munich 1985.

1887 births
1974 deaths
People from Berlin
Criminal psychologists
German criminologists
German psychologists
German revolutionaries
National Bolsheviks
20th-century psychologists